This is a list of the main career statistics of Spanish professional tennis player Tommy Robredo.

Performance timelines

Singles

Doubles

Major finals

Masters Series

Singles: 1 (1–0)

Doubles: 1 (1–1)

ATP career finals

Singles: 23 (12 titles, 11 runner-ups)

Doubles: 11 (5–6)

Challenger and Futures finals

Singles: 14 (8–6)

Doubles: 5 (3–2)

Wins over top 10 players
He has a  record against players who were, at the time the match was played, ranked in the top 10.

ATP Tour career earnings

* Statistics correct .

Notable exhibitions

Team competitions

See also
Spain Davis Cup team
List of Spain Davis Cup team representatives
Tennis in Spain
Sport in Spain

References

External links

 
 Tommy Robredo at the ITF profile
 

Tennis career statistics